The 2017 season is Chonburi's 12th season in the Thai League T1  since 2006.

Thai League

Thai FA Cup

Thai League Cup

Reserve team in Thai League 4

Chonburi send the reserve team to compete in T4 Eastern Region as Chonburi B.

Squad statistics
Statistics accurate as of 19 February 2017.

Transfers
First Thai footballer's market is opening on December 14, 2016 to January 28, 2017
Second Thai footballer's market is opening on June 3, 2017 to June 30, 2017

In

Out

Loan in

Loan out

Notes

References
 Chonburi F.C. Official Website
 Thai League Official Website

External links

Chonburi F.C. seasons
Association football in Thailand lists
CBR